Jai Singh Kanhaiya (1712–1793) was the founder and leader of the Kanhaiya Misl until his death. His daughter-in-law, Sada Kaur succeeded him in the leadership of the misl.

Early life
Jai Singh was born in a Jat family of the village Kahna, 21 km southwest of Lahore. His father, Khushal Singh, was a farmer and also sold wood and hay in Lahore and his family had humble origins. He was initiated into the Khalsa by Nawab Kapur Singh and joined the jatha of Amar Singh Kingra. In 1759, his wife Desan Kaur (who was the widow of Jhanda Singh) gave birth to his only son and heir Gurbaksh Singh.

Misldar

He worked in collaboration with Jassa Singh Ramgarhia, he seized a part of Riarki comprising the district of Gurdaspur and upper portions of Amritsar. His headquarters shifted from his wife's village at Sohian, 15 km from Amritsar to Batala to Mukerian.In 1763, Jai Singh Kanhaiya sacked Kasur along with Jassa Singh Ramgarhia and Hari Singh Dhillon, the Ramgarhias and kanhaiyas share all their booty equally, on this occasion Jassa Singh Ramgarhia tried to keep all the booty for himself, As a result, his relationship with Jassa Singh Ramgarhia deteriorated, He had territories on both sides of the rivers Beas and Ravi. Qazi Nur Muhammad, a historian, wrote in 1765 that Jai Singh Kanheya had extended his territory up to Parol, which was 70 km southeast of Jammu and that he was allied with Jassa Singh Ramgarhia because they shared the territory of Batala. The hill chiefs of Nurpur, Datarpur and Siba became his tributaries. In 1774, Jai Singh and Haqiqat Singh built a bazaar in Amritsar called the Katra Kanheyan. In October 1778 he collaborated with Mahan Singh Sukerchakia and Jassa Singh Ahluwalia to defeat Jassa Singh Ramgarhia and exiled him to the desert regions of Hansi and Hissar.  In 1781, he led an expedition into Jammu with Haqiqat Singh and received a tribute from Brij Raj Dev, the ruler of Jammu.

Conflict with Maha Singh
Haqiqat Singh Kanhaiya made an offer to Maha Singh attack to Jammu Jointly  and divide the booty equally Maha Singh agreed the plan was chalked out and the day of matching fixed in January In 1784 Maha Singh reached Jammu by a different route four days before the fixed day, he Plundered Jammu for three days and nights killing thousands of men the booty was secured was worth than one crore when Haqiqat Singh reached Jammu on the fixed day he found the town in flames and in ruins. This treachery shocked him so much that he died of grief on his return to his headquarter Fatehgarh, the death of Haqiqat Singh was great Loss to Jai Singh  he damanded the Half of the booty from Maha Singh for Haqiqat Singh Son, Jaimal Singh, which Maha Singh refused

On the Diwali day in 1784, all the Sikhs chiefs gathered at Amritsar, he behaved coldly with Maha Singh and refused his attempts to reconcile and called him Dancing boy Maha Singh took this insult to heart and he attacked Kanhaiya camp outside Amritsar, Jai Singh pursued him, A further engagements took place near Majitha, he was forced to seek shelter inside the town, which was besieged, he escaped into Jalandhar and prepared his army for battle against Maha Singh.

Maha Singh knows, he could not face him alone, so he invited Raja Sansar Chand Katoch and Jassa Singh Ramgarhia both enemies of Jai Singh to join him, Jassa Singh Ramgarhia crossed Satluj river and advanced towards Batala, the battle was fought in near Achal about 4 km from Batala, the battle continued for six hours Gurbaksh Singh Kanhaiya son of Jai Singh died in battle the Kanhaiya force's having lost their leader got disheartened and were routed

Gurbakhsh Singh death broke the back of his father who made no further resistance, He Burst into tears, emptied his quiver of its arrow and dismounting from his horse expose himself to the enemy fires, Tara Singh and Jaimal Singh took him away from the battle field to a place of safely Sada Kaur who was also present in the battle field escaped to her fort Sohian

He suddenly realised his mistake and made up his mind to fight the enemy, he retired from the battlefield and prepared his army, Jassa Singh Ramgarhia and Sansar Chand Katoch got busy in recovering their territories which he had seized, Maha Singh alone remained in the field a battle was fought between him and Maha Singh in Naushahra, Both side faced heavy casualties, he was repulsed, he fled away to Nurpur accompanied by Tara Singh and Jaimal Singh, Maha Singh pursued them, they entered the fort and Started Fighting, Maha Singh soon realised that he had come a long way from his base, he raised the siege and turned homeward, Jassa Singh Ramgarhia recovered his lost territory, Sansar Chand Katoch seized, Hijapur, Mukerian, whole country lying at the foot of the hills, Amar Singh Bagga fully established himself at sujanpur, Maha Singh seized Kanhaiya territories with worth a three lakhs a year,

Conflict with Sansar Chand
Sansar Chand Katoch requested Maha Singh to help him in getting back his kangra fort in return for two lakhs rupees tribute. Maha Singh promised to send a force on his arrival at Gujranwala
Meanwhile, Sansar Chand Katoch besieged Jai Singh fort of Atalgharh situated on the banks of river Beas, After four months of unsuccessful Sansar Chand raised the siege, By this time Maha Singh sent a strong contingent of 1000 troops under his two commanders, Daya Ram and Muhammad Salah, Along with Sansar Chand men's they besieged Kangra fort the siege lasted 6 six months, Maha Singh men ran short of money,  Sansar Chand declined to pay anything before the fall of fort, the two alies began to fight, Muhammad Salah was Killed in the engagement Daya Ram return to Gujranwala, Sansar Chand alone continued the siege, he realised that he had bleak chances to gain fort in an open fight, he restored to diplomacy, He sent message to Jai Singh that both of them should join to fight Mahan singh, he accepted the proposal, when he comes out the fort, Sansar Chand men's rushed in and after short scuffle, Sansar Chand seized the fort, After Ranjit Singh and Mehtab Kaur marriage, Maha Singh forced Sansar Chand to surrender all the Kanhaiyas territories situated at the foot of hills to Jai Singh

Matrimonial alliance
Sada Kaur, of the widow of Gurbaksh Singh Kanhaiya, was an intelligent and shrewd lady, she found it in the interest of the Kanhaiya Misl to bring about reconciliation with the Sukerchakia Misl, she made up her mind to get her only child Mehtab Kaur brothered to Maha Singh only son Ranjit Singh, she prevailed upon Jai Singh to approve of her proposal, Then she deputed Amar Singh Kingra to Maha Singh to consider the overture, She learnt that Maha Singh wife Raj Kaur had gone to Jawalamukhi on a pilgrimage to pray for the recovery of Ranjit Singh from smallpox, she immediately went there and persuaded the lady to accept her proposal, In 1786 Mehtab Kaur was married to Ranjit Singh who was only six year old, when the Sukerchakia and kanhaiya Misls were allied through matrimony,

Death
Jai Singh died in 1793 at the age of 81 date given by Kushwaqt Rae his contemporary

References

1712 births
1793 deaths
Indian Sikhs